Hamilton County is a county located in the U.S. state of Illinois. At the 2020 census, its population was 7,993. Its county seat is McLeansboro. It is located in the southern portion of the state known locally as "Little Egypt".

History
Hamilton County was formed out of White County in 1821. It is named for Alexander Hamilton, Revolutionary War hero and the first United States Secretary of the Treasury.

On  March 18, 1925, the infamous Tri-State Tornado tore across the county, destroying dozens of homes and farms in Flannigan, Twigg, Mayberry and Crook townships, and killing 37 people.

Geography

Climate and weather

Major highways
  Illinois Route 14
  Illinois Route 142
  Illinois Route 242

Adjacent counties
 Wayne County - north
 White County - east
 Gallatin County - southeast
 Saline County - south
 Franklin County - west
 Jefferson County - northwest

Demographics

As of the 2010 United States Census, there were 8,457 people, 3,489 households, and 2,376 families residing in the county. The racial makeup of the county was 98.2% white, 0.4% black or African American, 0.2% Asian, 0.2% American Indian, 0.3% from other races, and 0.7% from two or more races. Those of Hispanic or Latino origin made up 1.2% of the population. In terms of ancestry, 33.1% were German, 20.7% were Irish, 11.4% were English, and 10.3% were American.

Of the 3,489 households, 29.8% had children under the age of 18 living with them, 54.9% were married couples living together, 9.2% had a female householder with no husband present, 31.9% were non-families, and 28.1% of all households were made up of individuals. The average household size was 2.39 and the average family size was 2.91. The median age was 43.1 years.

The median income for a household in the county was $35,032 and the median income for a family was $50,878. Males had a median income of $45,245 versus $23,491 for females. The per capita income for the county was $21,602. About 8.2% of families and 14.5% of the population were below the poverty line, including 21.5% of those under age 18 and 8.5% of those age 65 or over.

Communities

City
 McLeansboro

Incorporated town
 Belle Prairie City

Villages
 Broughton
 Dahlgren
 Macedonia (partly in Franklin County)

Unincorporated communities

 Aden
 Blairsville (Flannigan's Store)
 Braden
 Dale
 Delafield
 Piopolis
 Rural Hill
 Tuckers Corners
 West Rural Hill

Townships
Hamilton County is divided into twelve townships:

 Beaver Creek
 Crook
 Crouch
 Dahlgren
 Flannigan
 Knights Prairie
 Mayberry
 McLeansboro
 South Crouch
 South Flannigan
 South Twigg
 Twigg

Politics
Like most of Southern-leaning Southern Illinois, Hamilton County was heavily Democratic before the Civil War, and unlike such counties as Johnson, Pope and Massac, it did not turn Republican after the war. Not until 1920, when isolationist sentiments turned many voters against the party of Woodrow Wilson, did Hamilton County vote Republican, and Herbert Hoover was to carry the county in 1928 due to anti-Catholic sentiment against Al Smith.

From 1940 onwards, when Wendell Willkie carried the county due to opposition to involvement in World War II, Hamilton has become increasingly Republican. Although Lyndon Johnson, Jimmy Carter in 1976 and Bill Clinton in 1992 all gained absolute majorities for the Democratic Party, since 1992, as with all traditionally Democratic parts of the Upland South, a rapid swing to the Republicans has taken place.

See also
 National Register of Historic Places listings in Hamilton County, Illinois

References

External links
 Hamilton County Illinois
 McLeansboro.com
 Hamilton County Community Unit District No.10 Schools
 Hamilton County Historical Society
 Hamilton County Foxes Football

 
Illinois counties
1821 establishments in Illinois
Populated places established in 1821
Hamilton County, Illinois
Mount Vernon, Illinois micropolitan area